Keng-Kyuyol (Kieŋ Küöl) is a rural locality (a selo), one of two settlements, in addition to Bagadya, in Botulunsky Rural Okrug of Verkhnevilyuysky District in the Sakha Republic, Russia. Its population as of the 2010 Census was 0, the same as recorded during the 2002 Census.

References

Notes

Sources
Official website of the Sakha Republic. Registry of the Administrative-Territorial Divisions of the Sakha Republic. Verkhnevilyuysky District. 

Rural localities in Verkhnevilyuysky District